Scott Ross (March 1, 1951 – June 13, 1989) was a United States-born harpsichordist who lived in France and Canada for many years. His recordings include the first complete recording by a single performer of the 555 harpsichord sonatas of Domenico Scarlatti.

Biography
Scott Stonebreaker Ross was born in Pittsburgh, Pennsylvania. He was nearly crippled by a severe scoliosis that kept him in a corset for much of his early life.

He studied piano and organ in Pittsburgh. Following the death of his father, a newspaper editor, he moved to France with his mother in 1964. His mother and brother soon returned to the US, but he remained in the country, living independently from the age of 13. He studied harpsichord at the Conservatoire de Nice, and during this period he was invited by Simone Demangel, the owner of chateau in the village of  Assas, near Montpellier, to give harpsichord lessons as a live-in tutor. His mother committed suicide on Ross's 19th birthday. After completing his studies at Nice, he enrolled at the Conservatoire de Paris.

In 1971 he was awarded the prestigious first prize of the "Concours de Bruges". Ross also took classes at the Royal Conservatoire of Antwerp from Kenneth Gilbert.

He then began a teaching career at the School of Music, Université Laval, Quebec. While there, he made award-winning recordings of the complete Pièces de Clavecin by Rameau and also recorded the complete keyboard works of François Couperin. Ross dressed in similar fashion to his students (even in performance), and his 'granny' spectacles appeared to align him more with the popular music icon John Lennon than the authentic performance scholar Gustav Leonhardt. For one concert at Université Laval that was attended by the university chancellor and the French Consul General he wore jeans and a red lumberjack shirt. Self-effacing to a fault, he explained, "I started the Goldbergs 'cause I quit smoking and, to keep one's fingers busy, it's better than knitting".

A passionate collector of orchids, his other hobbies included volcanology, mineralogy, and mycology. His keyboard interests were similarly wide-ranging, extending beyond the harpsichord to the music of Frédéric Chopin, Claude Debussy and Maurice Ravel that he performed on the piano, and he also accompanied Schubert lieder. He loved the music of Brian Eno and Philip Glass, and was a fan of the punk performance artist Nina Hagen. Comparisons which might be drawn between Ross and the Canadian pianist Glenn Gould (e.g., due to their common love of Baroque music and their unconventional approaches) are put into a fuller context by these comments from Ross in a documentary film made toward the end of his life:

In 1983 Ross took an indefinite sabbatical from Laval, embarking on several recordings for the French label Erato, including the Eight Great Suites of George Frideric Handel, Bach's 6 Partitas, and keyboard works by Jean-Henri d'Anglebert. (He also made two albums for EMI, including his last consisting of Girolamo Frescobaldi works.)

He returned to France, renting a small house in Assas and another in Paris. In 1984 he signed a five-year recording contract with Erato, but also experienced his first premonition of the illness that would later kill him.

The main fruit of his new contract was the daunting task of recording the complete keyboard sonatas (555 in total) of Domenico Scarlatti, a project started by Radio France, which decided to broadcast the sonatas in celebration of the 300th anniversary of the composer's birth, in 1985. Scott Ross began recording the sonatas on June 16, 1984, and during the eighteen months of recording he knew he had a fatal illness. Ninety-eight sessions were required, and the last take was completed on September 10, 1985. In all, there had been eight thousand takes. The recording was released on the Erato label as Domenico Scarlatti, Complete Keyboard Works in a set of 34 CDs.

Ross died of pneumonia related to AIDS on June 13, 1989, in his house in Assas, France, aged 38.

Notes

External links
 
 
 The Scarlatti sonatas re-released in a 34-CD boxed set by Warner Classics
 Scott Ross discography at medieval.org
 Scott Ross – Harpsichord Rebel at BBC Radio 3.

1951 births
1989 deaths
AIDS-related deaths in France
American classical musicians
American harpsichordists
American keyboardists
Musicians from Pittsburgh
American performers of early music
20th-century classical musicians
20th-century American musicians
Deaths from pneumonia in France
Classical musicians from Pennsylvania
Academic staff of Université Laval